Warren Montag (born March 21, 1952) is a professor of English at Occidental College in Los Angeles, California.  He is known primarily for his work on twentieth-century French theory, especially Althusser and his circle, as well as his studies of the philosophers Spinoza, Locke, and Hobbes.

Overview
Montag's work has focused on the origins and internal contradictions of political liberalism and individualism, and has demonstrated, following the suggestions of Étienne Balibar, the existence of "a fear of the masses" (or multitude) in the classic texts of seventeenth century liberal thought. More recently, he has shifted to a study of the emergence of the concept of the market in the work of Adam Smith. Montag received his B.A. from the University of California, Berkeley and his M.A. and Ph.D. from Claremont Graduate University.  He has published three books and three edited collections, and has translated many essays by Althusser. In addition, Montag has published more than forty essays. He resides in Los Angeles and is married with two children, Jacob Montag and Elisa Montag.

Publications

Books
Selected Essays (Leiden: E.J. Brill, forthcoming).
(Co-Editor) Systems of Life: Biopolitics, Economics, and Literature, 1750-1859 (New York: Fordham University Press, 2018).
(Co-Editor) Balibar and the Citizen Subject (Edinburgh: Edinburgh University Press, 2017).
(Co-Written) The Other Adam Smith (Stanford University Press, 2014).
Althusser and His Contemporaries: Philosophy's Perpetual War (Duke University Press, 2013).
 Louis Althusser. (London: Palgrave, 2002).
 (Co-Editor) Masses, Classes and The Public Sphere. (London: Verso, 2001).
 Bodies, Masses, Power: Spinoza and his Contemporaries. (London: Verso, Spring 1999). (Spanish translation, Ediciones Tierra de Nadie, 2005; Italian translation, Edizioni Ghibili, forthcoming).
 (Ed) In a Materialist Way: Selected Essays by Pierre Macherey. (London: Verso, 1998).
 (Co-Editor) The New Spinoza. (Minneapolis: University of Minnesota Press, 1997).
 The Unthinkable Swift: The Spontaneous Philosophy of a Church of England Man. (London: Verso, 1994).

Journal Special Issues
(Co-editor with Nancy Armstrong) differences: A Journal of Feminist Cultural Studies, Vol 20, n.3-4, 2009 ("The Future of the Human").

Essays
"Making Subjection Visible: The Materialist Effects of 1968," Crisis and Critique, 5:2 2018.
"Between Citizen and Subject," Radical Philosophy (2018) 2.02.
"Individuals Interpellable and Uninterpellable," Postmodern Culture (2017).
"Who/What, Before/After: the Unrest of the Subject," Cultural Critique (2017) 83 (1), 139-155.
(with Nancy Armstrong), "Is the Novel Literature?" Novel (2017) Novel: A Forum on Fiction 50 (3), 338-350.
(with Nancy Armstrong), "The Figure in the Carpet," PMLA, 2017.
"Legacies of the Russian Revolution: Power, Equality, Right," Crisis and Critique 4:2, 2017.
"The Last Instance: Resnick and Wolff at the Point of Heresy," Knowledge, Class, and Economics: Marxism without Guarantees. Ed. Rob Garnett. London: Routledge, 2017.
"Althusser's Empty Signifier: What is the Meaning of the Word "Interpellation?" Mediations (2017).
"Commanding the Body in Spinoza's Ethics." Spinoza's Authority, Ed. K. Kordela and D. Vardoulakis. London: Bloomsbury, 2017.
"'To Shatter All the Classical Theories of Causality': Immanent and Absent Causes in Althusser and Lacan (1963-1965)." The Concept in Crisis: Reading Capital Today. ed. N. Nesbitt. Durham: Duke University Press, 2017.
"A Parallelism of Consciousness and Property: Balibar's Reading of Locke," Balibar and the Citizen Subject. Ed. Montag and Elsayed. Edinburgh: Edinburgh University Press, 2017.
"The Prisoners of Starvation, or Necessitas dat Legem." New Formations. 2017, Issue 89/90.
"'Uno mero esecutore': Moses, Fortuna and Occasione in The Prince," Machiavelli's The Prince: Five Centuries of History, Conflict an Politics. Ed. F. Del Lucchese and V. Morfino (London: Palgrave, 2016).
"From Clinamen to Conatus: Deleuze, Lucretius and Spinoza," in Lucretius and Modernity, ed. Jacques Lezra. Palgrave Macmillan. 2016. French Translation.
"Discourse and Decree: Spinoza, Althusser, Pêcheux," Cahiers du GRM 7, 2015. Spanish Translation 2016.
"Althusser's Lenin," Diacritics (43:2) 2015. French version, 2015.
"Althusser's Authorless Theater," Differences (26:3) 2015. Spanish Translation 2017.
"Before the Beginning: On the question of Origins in Hegel" PMLA (130.3) 2015.
"Althusser and the Problem of Eschatology" Althusser and Theology. Ed Agon Hamza. London: Bloomsbury, 2016. Spanish translation 2017.
"Rancière's Lost Object" Cultural Critique. vol 83, Winter 2013. 139-155.
"Althusser: Law and the Threat of the Outside," Althusser and Law, ed. Laurent du Sutter. Routledge, 2013.
"Macherey entre le quotidien et l'utopie," La Revue des Livres (Mai-Juin 2013).
"Between Interpellation and Immunization: Althusser, Balibar and Esposito," Postmodern Culture, Vol. 33, Number 3, 2012. Spanish translation 2014.
"Conjuncture, Conflict, War: Machiavelli Between Althusser and Foucault (1975-1976)," Encountering Althusser, ed. Peter Thomas. Continuum, 2012.
"Hegel, sive Spinoza, or Hegel as his Own True Other," Hegel after Spinoza, ed. Hasana Sharp and Jason Smith. Continuum 2012. Italian translation, 2014.
"El afuera de la ley: Schmitt, Kelsen y la Resistencia legal a la ley," Youkali 13 (2012).
"To discompose and disorder the whole machine of the world:" Adam Smith, Epicurus and Lucretius," Rivista di storia della filosofia 67:2 (2012): 267-276.
Introduction to Louis Althusser, "Student Problems," Radical Philosophy 170, Nov-Dec 2011.
"Immanence, Transcendence and the Trace: Derrida between Levinas and Spinoza," Badmidbar: a Journal of Jewish Thought and Philosophy, 2, Autumn 2011.
"Lucretius Hebraizant: Spinoza's Reading of Ecclesiastes," European Journal of Philosophy, 20 (2012). Spanish translation, Spinoza contemporaneo. Ed. Galcerán and Espinoza. Madrid: Tierradenadie ediciones, 2009. 
"Louis Althusser." The Encyclopedia of Continental Philosophy. Vol. 6, ed. Alan Schrift. London: Acumen Press, forthcoming.
“The Late Althusser: Materialism of the Encounter or Philosophy of Nothing?” Culture, Theory and Critique, Vol. 51, Issue.2, pp. 157–70, 2010; Religgere Il Capitale: La lezione di Louis Althusser. Edizione Mimesis (Italian Translation), forthcoming; Problemi (Slovenian trans.), forthcoming.
"Interjecting Empty Spaces: Imagination and Interpretation in Spinoza's Tractatus Theologica-Politicus" in Spinoza Now ed. Dimitris Vardoulakis, University of Minnesota Press, 2011.
"Spectres d' Althusser," La revue internationale des livres et des idées, janvier-février 2010, no. 15. English version, Historical Materialism.
"Imitating the Affects of Beasts: Interest and Inhumanity in Spinoza," differences: A Journal of Feminist Cultural Studies. Vol 20, n.3-4, 2009. (Spanish translation 2009) (Italian translation forthcoming).
"War and the Market: The Global South in the Origins of Neo-liberalism." The Global South, April 2009, Vol.3, no.1.
"Locke et le concept d'inhuman." Multitudes. no.33, Eté 2008.
"Semites, ou la fiction de l'autre." (review essay) La revue internationale des livres et des idees. mai-juin 2008, no.5
"Tumultuous Combinations: Transindividuality in Adam Smith and Spinoza," Graduate Faculty Philosophy Journal 28(1)2007.
"El peligroso derecho a la existencia: la necroeconomia de Von Mises y Hayek." Youkali. 2 November 2006.
"Necro-Economics: Adam Smith and Death in the Life of the Universal," Radical Philosophy (November 2005), Youkali 1 April 2006 (Spanish translation), Critica Marxista 23, 2006 (Portuguese trans.).
"Jonathan Swift." Encyclopedia of British Literary History, Oxford University Press, 2006.
"Louis Althusser: the Intellectual and the Conjuncture." Marxism, Intellectuals and Politics, ed. David Bates, London: Palgrave, 2006. Abridged version in Il Manifesto. Nov. 9, 2006 (Italian translation).
"Foucault: the Immanence of Law in Power." Michel Foucault and Social Control, ed. Alain Beaulieu and David Gabbard, Lexington Press, 2005; French version Editions Harmattan, forthcoming).
"Foucault and the Problematic of Origins: Althusser’s Reading of Folie et déraison." Borderlands 4.2, 2005. Actuel Marx (French trans. 2004); Theseis (Greek trans. 2004).
"Who’s Afraid of the Multitude: Between the Individual and the State." South Atlantic Quarterly (Fall 2005). Slagmark n.39 2004 (Danish trans.); Quaderni Materialisti n.2 2004 (Italian trans.); Theseis (Greek trans. 2004).
"Spinoza's Spirit: the Concept of the Trace in Levinas and Derrida" Specters of Derrida, ed. Julian Wolfreys (SUNY Press, forthcoming). Oltrecorrente (Italian trans. forthcoming).
"On the Function of the Concept of Origin: Althusser’s Reading of Locke", Current Continental Theory and Early Modern Philosophy, ed. Stephen Daniels (Northwestern U P: 2006).
"Materiality, Singularity, Subject: Response to Callari, Hardt, Parker and Smith", Symposium on Louis Althusser, Rethinking Marxism(17:2, April 2005).
"Politics: Transcendent or Immanent? A response to Miguel Vatter," Theory and Event (7:4, 2004).
"Der neue Spinoza" Immaterielle Arbeit und imperiale Souveräinität ed. Thomas Atzert and Jost Müller (Munster: Westfälisches Dampfboot, 2004).
"La dialectique à la cantonade: Althusser devant l’art." Sartre, Althusser, Lukacs ed. Eustache Kouvelakis (Paris: Presses Universitaires de France, 2004).
"Towards a Conception of Racism without Race: Foucault and Contemporary Bio-politics," Pli: The Warwick Journal of Philosophy (2002).
"From the Standpoint of the Masses: Antonio Negri’s Insurgencies" (review essay) Historical Materialism 9 2002.
"Descartes and Spinoza" and "Althusser" The Edinburgh Encyclopedia of Literary Criticism and Theory 1945-2000, ed. Julian Wolfreys (Edinburgh: Edinburgh U P, 2002).
"Vers une conception du racisme sans race: Foucault et la biopolitique contemporaine", Foucault et la médecine ed. Philippe Artières et Emmanuel da Silva (Paris: Kimé, 2001).
"Gulliver’s Solitude: the Paradoxes of Swift’s Anti-Individualism", Eighteenth-Century: Theory and Interpretation 42:1 2001.
"The Pressure of the Street: Habermas’s Fear of the Masses", Masses, Classes, Counterpublics, ed. Mike Hill and Warren Montag (London: Verso, 2001)
"Spinoza and the Concept of the Shekhinah." Jewish Themes in Spinoza's Philosophy, ed. Lenn Goodman and Heidi Ravven. (Albany: SUNY Press, 2002).
Preface to Etienne Balibar, Spinoza and Politics (London: Verso, 1998).
"Althusser's Nominalism: Structure and Singularity 1962-1966." Rethinking Marxism 10:3 (Fall 1998).
"Spirits Armed and Unarmed: Derrida's Specters", Ghostlier Demarcations ed. Michael Sprinker (London: Verso,1999)(Spanish translation, 2002, Turkish translation 2004, Portuguese translation 2008, Italian translation 2009).
"Second Response to Carole Fabricant" (on Swift), Eighteenth-Century Fiction, 10:1, 1997.
"Response to Carole Fabricant" (on Swift), Eighteenth-Century Fiction, 9:1, 1996.
"The Universalization of Whiteness: Racism and Enlightenment", Whiteness: A Critical Reader, ed. Mike Hill (New York: New York University Press, 1997).
"The Soul is the Prison of the Body: Althusser and Foucault 1970-1975", Yale French Studies, Fall 1995.
"Beyond Force and Consent: Hobbes, Spinoza, Althusser." Marxism and Postmodernism: Essays in the Althusserian Tradition, eds. Antonio Callari and David Ruccio (Middletown: Wesleyan University Press, 1995). (Korean translation 1998, Norwegian translation forthcoming).
"A Process without a Subject or Goal(s): How to Read Althusser's Autobiography", Marxism in the New World Order: Crises and Possibilities, ed. Antonio Callari (New York: Guilford Press, 1995) (Korean translation 1996; Greek translation 1998).
"Althusser and Spinoza Against Hermeneutics: Interpretation or Intervention?" The Althusserian Legacy, eds. E. Ann Kaplan and Michael Sprinker (London: Verso, 1993).
"The Workshop of Filthy Creation: A Marxist Reading of Frankenstein in Mary Shelley's Frankenstein: A Case Study in Contemporary Criticism." eds. Ross C. Murfin and Johanna Smith (New York: St. Martin's Press, 1991, Second Edition, 2000).
"The Emptiness of a Distance Taken: Freud, Lacan, Althusser." Rethinking Marxism, Spring, 1991 (Korean translation, 1994).
"Spinoza: Politics in a World Without Transcendence", Rethinking Marxism, Fall 1989. (Swedish translations 2004).
"What is at Stake in the Debate on Postmodernism", Postmodernism and Its Discontents, (London: Verso, 1988). (Korean Translation 1990, Portuguese translation 1993).
"Macherey and Literary Analysis", Minnesota Review, Spring 1986.
"Lacan and Feminine Sexuality", Quarterly Review of Film Studies, Fall 1985.
"Marxism and Psychoanalysis: The Impossible Encounter." Minnesota Review, Fall 1984 (Korean Translation 1992).

Translations
Louis Althusser, "Letter on Gramsci," Decalages 2.1.
Etienne Balibar, "Schmitt's Hobbes, Hobbes' Schmitt," Balibar and the Citizen Subject (Edinburgh: Edinburgh University Press, 2017).
Etienne Balibar, Identity and Difference: Locke's Invention of Consciousness, (Verso, 2013).
(with Willi Goetschel) Jacques Derrida, "Language and the Discourse of Method," Badmidbar: a Journal of Jewish Thought and Philosophy, 2, Autumn 2011.
Louis Althusser, "On Marx and Freud." Rethinking Marxism, Spring, 1991.
Louis Althusser, Philosophy and the Spontaneous Philosophy of the Scientists: And Other Essays, (London: Verso, 1990).
Michel Pêcheux, "Discourse: Structure or Event?" Marxism and the Interpretation of Culture. (Urbana, University of Illinois Press, 1988).
Pierre Macherey, "History and Novel in Balzac's The Peasants." Minnesota Review, Spring 1986.

Literary Translations 

 Jorge Luis Borges, "Clouds," Ambit 2019

Interviews, and Shorter Scholarly and Political Texts 

 Althusser, Spinoza and Revolution in Philosophy, Voices of the Left, London: Redmarks, 2019 (Italian and Greek translations 2018).
Netflix's Trotsky, Left Voice, March 11, 2019 (Spanish, German, Catalan, and Turkish translations, 2019).
"Reassessing Althusser on his 100th Anniversary," Left Voice, October 16, 2019 (Spanish translation, 2019).
Althusser's Machiavellian Line, (English original with French translation), 2018. Papiers Althusser. 
Introduction to "Louis Althusser - 'Michel Verret's Article on the "student May"' (2018)
"July 5, 2015 Oxi: an Open Letter in Support of the Greek People" (English original with Greek Translation)
"The Tenth Anniversary of Hurricane Katrina" The Philosophical Salon (2015)

External links
Montag sites and homepages
Décalages: An Althusser Studies Journal Montag is listed as the Editor of this journal. At the site, articles are available in pdf format (follow endnote link here for a further description of this journal)~> 
Montag's Faculty Homepage at Occidental College
Online publications
'Foucault and the Problematic of Origins': Althusser's Reading of Folie et déraison an essay by Montag published in the e-journal "borderlands" in 2005
Who's Afraid of the Multitude?: Between the Individual and the State
Interviews and talks
What's Left after Iraq?: An interview with Warren Montag This interview was conducted by Tassos Betzelos, on 12 March 2004. For more information on the circumstances of this interview, see the endnote 
Spinoza and philosophers today Montag's remark here are made in a kind of "round-table" discussion.

Endnotes and references

1952 births
Living people
American academics of English literature
University of California, Berkeley alumni
Marxist theorists
Spinoza scholars